Daniel Ferreira (born 25 September 1982 in Asunción, Paraguay) is a Paraguayan footballer currently playing for San Simón in Peruvian Primera División.

Teams
  Olimpia 2004
  Sportivo Luqueño 2004–2006
  12 de Octubre 2006–2007
  Barcelona 2007
  Tacuary 2008
  Sportivo Luqueño 2009
  Olimpia 2009
  Sportivo Luqueño 2010–2011
  Deportes Copiapó 2011
  Real Garcilaso 2012
  General Díaz 2013
  San Simón 2014–present

References
 Profile at BDFA 
 

1982 births
Living people
Paraguayan footballers
Paraguayan expatriate footballers
Barcelona S.C. footballers
12 de Octubre Football Club players
Club Tacuary footballers
Club Olimpia footballers
Sportivo Luqueño players
Deportes Copiapó footballers
Primera B de Chile players
Peruvian Primera División players
Expatriate footballers in Chile
Expatriate footballers in Ecuador
Expatriate footballers in Peru
Association footballers not categorized by position